Kenneth Bain is an American professor and author, currently the President of the Best Teachers Institute, a research and educational organization in New Jersey and Washington, D.C., and he was previously the Provost and Vice President of Academic Affairs at University of the District of Columbia. Having served at these, he also founded several schools, the Center for Teaching Excellence at New York University, Searle Center for Teaching Excellence at Northwestern University, Center for Teaching at Vanderbilt University and also the Research Academy for University Learning at Montclair University. As an author, he is best known for his book What the Best College Teachers Do (Harvard University Press), a best-selling book of higher education, which is currently held in over 2,000 libraries worldwide, including of which Bain himself is held in over 5,000 libraries worldwide, as of 2016.

References

Writers from Springfield, Missouri
Vanderbilt University faculty
Northwestern University faculty
New York University faculty
University of Texas faculty
Living people
Year of birth missing (living people)
Place of birth missing (living people)
American expatriate academics
American expatriates in Canada
American male non-fiction writers
American education writers
Academic staff of Mount Saint Vincent University